Dave Clark's "Time" is a concept album based on Dave Clark's 1986 musical Time.
It was released in vinyl as a double LP (Catalog number: AMPM 1, EQ 5003) and in cassette format. It sold over two million copies and spawned four hit singles, one by Julian Lennon and two by Cliff Richard. Another song, "In My Defence", became a posthumous hit for Freddie Mercury in 1992.

The album had never been transferred onto digital format until May 8, 2012, when a restored edition of the soundtrack, remastered by Adam Vanryne and produced by Dave Clark, was released on 
iTunes  to commemorate the musical's 25th anniversary. This reissue also features a 20-page color booklet.

Track listing

Charts

See also
Time (musical)
Time (Freddie Mercury song)
In My Defence

References

External links
 The Official Time – The Album website
(http://www.timethemusicalfansite.com)

1986 albums
Concept albums